"Not for All the Love in the World" is the second single from the album Let's Bottle Bohemia by Irish Alternative Rock band The Thrills. It was released on 15 November 2004. The single marked a significant change in the band's direction as a slower, more melancholic release. The song reached number 38 on the Irish Singles Chart and number 39 on the UK Singles Chart. It was also one of two Thrills songs to chart on the US Billboard Adult Alternative Songs chart, peaking at number 15 in September 2004, a month and a half before its European release.

Track listing

Charts

References

2004 singles
The Thrills songs
Song recordings produced by Dave Sardy
Virgin Records singles
2004 songs
2000s ballads